Gephyrosaurus is a genus of early rhynchocephalian first described and named in 1980 by Susan E. Evans.
They are distantly related to the extant Sphenodon (tuatara of New Zealand) with which they shared a number of skeletal features including a large tooth row along the side of the palatine bone (part of the palate) and posterior process of the dentary bone (part of the lower jaw). The type species, G. bridensis, lived during  Early Jurassic in Wales, UK.<ref>Jones, M.E.H. 2009. Dentary tooth shape in Sphenodon'  and its fossil relatives (Diapsida: Lepidosauria: Rhynchocephalia). In Koppe, T., Meyer, G., Alt, K.W., eds. Interdisciplinary Dental Morphology, Frontiers of Oral Biology (vol 13). Greifswald, Germany; Karger. 9–15.</ref> Whiteside & Duffin (2017) described the second species, G. evansae, known from a partial maxilla recovered from Late Triassic (Rhaetian) fissure fills in Carboniferous Limestone in Somerset. They and other potential gephyrosaurids are the only rhynchocephalians to lie outside Sphenodontia in modern definitions of the group, and have been found to be more closely related to squamates in some phylogenetic analyses.

Anatomical Description

Limbs
Observation of the skeletal elements of Gephyrosaurus bridensis makes it evident that this was very much a lizard-like creature.
It possessed relatively long, slender legs which would allow it to run quickly in pursuit of prey or in escape from larger predators.
While many small lizards are able to climb trees, it is possible this organism was not fully arboreal although it possessed strong legs and claws which would make it possible to climb.
It is unlikely Gephyrosaurus was bipedal.

Vertebrae
Two distinct vertebrae from Gephyrosaurus bridensis were described, and these vertebrae are very similar to the modern Rhychocephalian Sphenodon, providing strong evidence that the two genera are related 

DentitionGephyrosaurus bridensis possessed pleurodont dentition that is believed to have replaced slowly during the animal's lifetime. In her 1985 paper, Evans suggests that this could be the ancestral state for tooth replacement in lepidosaurs.

BehaviorGephyrosaurus'' was a terrestrial reptile and is assumed to be an insectivore that used a patient feeding strategy as it waited for prey to arrive.
High incidence of jaw fractures found among specimens infers that this animal was potentially territorial and would attack those who crossed into their home range.

References

Sphenodontia
Jurassic lepidosaurs
Late Triassic reptiles of Europe
Prehistoric life of Europe
Prehistoric reptile genera
Taxa named by Susan E. Evans
Fossil taxa described in 1980